The Ghana Stock Exchange (GSE) is the principal stock exchange of Ghana.  The exchange was incorporated in July 1989 with trading commencing in 1990. It currently lists 42 equities (from 37 companies) and 2 corporate bonds. All types of securities can be listed. Criteria for listing include capital adequacy, profitability, spread of shares, years of existence and management efficiency.  The GSE is located within the Cedi House in Accra.

History and operations
Since its inception, the GSE's listings have been included in the main index, the GSE All-Share Index. In 1993, the GSE was the sixth best index performing emerging stock market, with a capital appreciation of 116%. In 1994 it was the best index performing stock market among all emerging markets, gaining 124.3% in its index level. 1995's index growth was 6.3%, partly because of high inflation and interest rates.

Growth of the index for 1997 was 42%, and at the end of 1998 it was 868.35 (see the 1998 Review for more information). As of October 2006 the market capitalization of the Ghana Stock Exchange was about 111,500 billion cedis ($11.5 billion). As of December 31, 2007, the GSE's market capitalization was 131,633.22 billion cedis. In 2007, the index appreciated by 31.84% (see the "Publications" section on the GSE's website for more information).

The manufacturing and brewing sectors currently dominate the exchange. A distant third is the banking sector while other listed companies fall into the insurance, mining and petroleum sectors. Most of the listed companies on the GSE are Ghanaian but there are some multinationals.

Although non-resident investors can deal in securities listed on the exchange without obtaining prior exchange control permission, there are some restrictions on portfolio investors not resident in Ghana. The current limits on all types of non-resident investor holdings (be they institutional or individual) are as follows: a single investor (i.e. one who is not a Ghanaian and who lives outside the country) is allowed to hold up to 10% of every equity. Secondly, for every equity, foreign investors may hold up to a cumulative total of 74% (in special circumstances, this limit may be waived). The limits also exclude trade in Ashanti Goldfields shares. These restrictions were abolished by the Foreign Exchange Act, 2006 (Act 723).

There is an 8% withholding tax on dividend income for all investors. Capital gains on securities listed on the exchange will remain exempt from tax until 2015. The exemption of capital gains applies to all investors on the exchange. There are no exchange control regulations on the remittance of original investment capital, capital gains, dividends, interest payments, returns and other related earnings.

Potential changes at the exchange include the introduction of automated trading and the listing of some state banks. The Bank of Ghana plans the development of mutual funds, unit trusts and municipal bonds at a subsequent date. These changes are aimed at making the exchange more relevant, efficient and effective. The exchange was also involved in preparing the draft law on collective investment vehicles.

Hours
The exchange has pre-market sessions from 9:30am to 10:00am and a continuous auction session from 10:00am to 3:00pm GMT on all days of the week except Saturdays, Sundays and holidays declared by the exchange in advance.

Licensed brokers
The websites of licensed dealing members, or "LDMs", of the Ghana Stock Exchange typically include detailed information about the exchange, daily rates, company research and further links.  Licensed brokers of the GSE include:
  Stanbic Bank Ghana
  IC Securities
  Databank Group
  Gold Coast Securities
  NTHC
  Securities Discount Brokers
  FirstBanC Brokerage Services Ltd
 Merban Stockbrokers Ltd

See also
 List of companies of Ghana
 GSE Composite Index
 List of African stock exchanges
 List of stock exchanges
 List of stock exchanges in the Commonwealth of Nations

References

 
Financial services companies established in 1989
Stock exchanges in Ghana
Economy of Ghana
Companies based in Accra
Organizations established in 1989
Ghanaian companies established in 1989